Huang Hsin (sometimes rendered as Hsin Huang in Western media, Born December 28, 1995 ) is a Taiwanese professional pocket billiards (pool) player.

Career
She was the 2001 Canadian Nine-Ball Champion  and won WPBA Rookie of the Year in 2004.

References

1995 births
Taiwanese pool players
Female pool players
Living people
Date of birth missing (living people)
Place of birth missing (living people)